Alisa Kleybanova won in the final 6–3, 6–2, against Elena Dementieva.

Seeds

Draw

Finals

Top half

Bottom half

Qualifying

Seeds

Qualifiers

Lucky loser
  Zhang Shuai

Draw

First qualifier

Second qualifier

Third qualifier

Fourth qualifier

External links
Main Draw
Qualifying Draw

Malaysian Open - Singles
2010 Singles